Huang Yu (7 November 1916 – 24 May 2013) was a Chinese film director, screenwriter and actor. His acting career began in Shanghai in the 1930s. In the 1940s he went to British Hong Kong and became a filmmaker with the left-wing Great Wall Movie Enterprises. He directed 29 films between 1953 and 1981.

His wife Wu Pei-yung (吳佩蓉) frequently worked on his films as script supervisor, screenwriter, actress, make-up artist, assistant director or co-director.

Filmography

As actor

As assistant director

1949: Our Husband (春雷)
1950: The Awful Truth (說謊世界)
1951: A Night-Time Wife (禁婚記)
1952: Nonya (娘惹)
1952: Unknown Father (不知道的父親)
1953: A Torn Lily (孽海花)
1954: Till We Meet Again (深閨夢裡人)

As director

References

External links

1916 births
2013 deaths
Hong Kong film directors
Chinese male film actors
Hong Kong male film actors
20th-century Chinese male actors
20th-century Hong Kong male actors
Film directors from Shanghai
Male actors from Shanghai
Chinese emigrants to British Hong Kong